Gummibär & Friends: The Gummy Bear Show is an animated web series based on the Gummibär character and virtual band. Produced by Toonz Media Group and Gummybear International, and directed by Valeriya Kucherenko, the series premiered on YouTube on June 24, 2016 before being exported across the world on April 1, 2020.

Premise
The Gummy Bear Show follows a green anthropomorphic male gummy bear named Gummibär (nicknamed Gummy). He lives with his two friends (who are returning characters from The Yummy Gummy Search for Santa): Harry, a male chameleon who studies science, and Kala, a female cat who is a master of martial arts. Throughout the series, the three interact with other characters, including Mr. Kronk, Gummy's grouchy rival, and Granny Peters, an elderly scientist who enjoys baking cookies.

Voice cast 

 Phillipa Alexander as Gummibär, a green gummy bear who loves to make music. In the series he goes by the name "Gummy".
 Christian A. Schneider voices Gummy's singing voice.
 Adam Diggle as Harry, a chameleon who likes science and mathematics.
 Becca Stewart as Kala, a blue cat who loves kung fu and martial arts.
 Dan Russell as Granny Peters, a mad scientist, which she tends to keep a secret from Gummy and friends. She also likes baking and gardening.

Russell also voices the grouchy Mr. Kronk. The cast is uncredited in the show.

Episodes

Series overview

International versions

Season 1 (2016–17)

Season 2 (2018–22) 
In 2018, Toonz Media Group announced a second season of the Gummibär & Friends - The Gummy Bear Show

Season 2 premiered on December 13, 2018 on YouTube and ended on August 26, 2022.

Other media

Toys and merchandise 
Gummy Bear International sells a variety of products based on the show's episodes and characters.

Soundtrack 

The Gummy Bear Show: Season One Soundtrack is the official soundtrack to the first season of Gummibär & Friends, credited to animated character Gummibär. The album features 40 songs from the show.

Track list

Track lengths per Amazon Music.

Notes

References

External links 
 

German television series
Gummibär